Adrienne Cornelia "Janet" Dykman (born January 17, 1954) is an American archer.

Dykman was born in Monterey Park, California. She was a member of four Olympic archery teams and an alternate on one Olympic team. Her Olympic appearances included 1992, 1996, 2000, 2004 and 2008. In four Pan-American games she won a gold medal as a member of the women's team. In 1991, she broke the 50-meter record and received a gold medal. In 1995, she was the National Field Archery Champion and also won the National Archery Target Championship. Currently, she still competes on the California state indoor and outdoor circuits and in Traditional National Archery Tournaments.

Dykman represented the U.S. at the 2004 Summer Olympics.  She placed 44th in the women's individual ranking round with a 72-arrow score of 619.  In the first round of elimination, she faced 21st-ranked and eventual bronze medalist Alison Williamson of Great Britain.  Dykman lost 147-121 in the 18-arrow match, placing 60th overall in women's individual archery.

Dykman was also a member of the 13th-place American women's archery team. Besides the 2004 Summer Olympics in Greece, she also competed at the 1996 Summer Olympics in Atlanta, the 2000 Summer Olympics in Sydney, and the 2008 Summer Olympics in Beijing.

References
 
 women's-sports-reference
 sports-archery-article

1954 births
Living people
American female archers
Archers at the 1996 Summer Olympics
Archers at the 2000 Summer Olympics
Archers at the 2004 Summer Olympics
Olympic archers of the United States
Sportspeople from Los Angeles County, California
People from Monterey Park, California
Pan American Games gold medalists for the United States
Pan American Games silver medalists for the United States
Pan American Games medalists in archery
Archers at the 1991 Pan American Games
Archers at the 1995 Pan American Games
Archers at the 1999 Pan American Games
Archers at the 2003 Pan American Games
Medalists at the 1991 Pan American Games
Medalists at the 1995 Pan American Games
Medalists at the 1999 Pan American Games
Medalists at the 2003 Pan American Games
21st-century American women